Husky Field is a baseball venue on the campus of Houston Christian University in Houston, Texas, United States. It is home to the Houston Christian Huskies baseball team of the NCAA Division I Southland Conference. Opened in 1993, it has a capacity of 500 spectators. The facility features a press box and natural grass surface. It hosted the 2008 Red River Athletic Conference Baseball Tournament and the 2007 NAIA Region IV Tournament. Construction began on a 7,200 square-foot indoor facility in early-September 2022, located down the right field line.

Gallery

See also
 List of NCAA Division I baseball venues

Footnotes

References

External links 

College baseball venues in the United States
Baseball venues in Texas
Houston Christian Huskies baseball
1993 establishments in Texas
Sports venues completed in 1993
Baseball venues in Houston